Hodgkins Seamount is a seamount in the Kodiak-Bowie Seamount chain, located south of Pierce Seamount and north of Bowie Seamount. It has apparently experienced two generically different episodes of volcanism, separated by about 12 million years. Like the rest of the Kodiak-Bowie seamounts, it was formed by the Bowie hotspot.

See also
Volcanism of Canada
Volcanism of Western Canada
List of volcanoes in Canada

References

External links

Submarine volcanoes
Hotspot volcanoes
Volcanoes of British Columbia
Seamounts of the Pacific Ocean
Polygenetic volcanoes
Seamounts of Canada